Ann-Kathrin Linsenhoff (born 1 August 1960, in Düsseldorf) is a German equestrian and Olympic champion. She won a gold medal in team dressage at the 1988 Summer Olympics in Seoul.

She is daughter of equestrian and Olympic champion Liselott Linsenhoff. She was appointed UNICEF Goodwill Ambassador in 2002.

References

1960 births
Living people
German dressage riders
Olympic equestrians of West Germany
German female equestrians
Olympic gold medalists for West Germany
Equestrians at the 1988 Summer Olympics
Sportspeople from Düsseldorf
UNICEF Goodwill Ambassadors
Olympic medalists in equestrian
Medalists at the 1988 Summer Olympics